The Public Health Foundation of India (PHFI) is a not for profit public private initiative working towards a healthier India. A national consultation, convened by the Union Ministry of Health and Family Welfare in September 2004, recommended a foundation which could rapidly advance public health education, training, research and advocacy.

The Government of India enabled the setting up of PHFI in 2006 in response to the limited
public health institutional capacity and the foundation was established to strengthen training, research and policy through interdisciplinary and health system connected education and, policy programme relevant research, evidence based & equity promoting policy development, affordable health technologies, people empowering health promotion & advocacy for prioritised health causes in the area of Public Health.

The Genesis of PHFI
The Public Health Foundation of India (PHFI) was conceptualised as a response to growing concern over the emerging public health challenges in India.  It recognizes the fact that meeting the shortfall of health professionals is imperative for a sustained and holistic response to the public health concerns in the country, which in turn requires health care to be addressed not only from the scientific perspective of what works, but also from the social perspective of who needs it the most. The PHFI concept was developed over two years and was collaboratively evolved through consultation with multiple constituencies including Indian and international academia, State and Central Governments in India, multi & bi-lateral agencies, civil society groups in India.

PHFI has set up four  Centres of Excellence(CoE) to raise awareness and strengthen research, training and education in the high priority area of public health in India.

 SACDIR (South Asia Centre for Disability Inclusive Development and Research)
 The Ramalingaswami Centre for Social Determinants of Health
The Centre for Chronic Conditions and Injuries (CCCI)
Centre for Environmental Health was established in May 2016 with support from Tata Sons and Tata Consultancy Services.

Indian Institutes of Public Health
PHFI has established five Indian Institutes of Public Health (IIPHs) in Bhubaneswar, Delhi, Gandhinagar, Hyderabad and Shillong. The institutes are aimed at being research and education institutes focusing on public health.

In 2015 Indian Institute of Public Health, Gandhinagar was the first IIPH to be granted autonomous university status through The Indian Institute of Public Health Gandhinagar Act, 2015.

Funding 
PHFI receives funding through general donations and project-specific grants from government agencies, corporations, philanthropic organizations and individuals. Funders include:

References

 PMs address at the Launch of PHFI

External links
 Official website

Public health organisations based in India
Organizations established in 2006
Organisations based in Delhi
Foundations based in India
Medical and health foundations
Think tanks based in India